The Experience (Tajrobe) is a 1973 Iranian feature film directed by Abbas Kiarostami. It is Kiarostami's feature-length directorial debut.

Film details 

Mamad, an orphaned teenager, works as a messenger boy in a photographic studio, where he also sleeps at night. He falls platonically in love with a girl from a wealthier class. One day, thinking he sees her smiling at him, he decides to go to her house and ask for a job as a servant, so that he can be closer to her, but he receives only a decisive refusal.

See also
List of Iranian films

External links

Films directed by Abbas Kiarostami
1973 films
1970s Persian-language films
Iranian black-and-white films